Hibbertia puberula is a species of flowering plant in the family Dilleniaceae and is endemic to New South Wales. It is a small shrub with softly-hairy foliage, narrow egg-shaped to almost linear leaves, and yellow flowers usually arranged singly short side shoots with ten to fourteen stamens on one side of two carpels.

Description
Flowering mainly occurs from October to November.

Taxonomy
Hibbertia puberula was first formally described in 2010 by Hellmut R. Toelken in the Journal of the Adelaide Botanic Gardens from specimens collected at Yowie Bay in 1908 by Arthur Andrew Hamilton. The specific epithet (puberula) means "minutely pubescent", referring to the few soft, simple hairs on the leaves and ovary.

In a 2012 edition of the same journal, Toelken described three subspecies and the names are accepted by the Australian Plant Census:
 Hibbertia puberula subsp. extensa R.T.Mill. usually has six or seven stamens;

Distribution and habitat
This hibbertia grows in sandy soil over sandstone in the Sydney basin. Subspecies extensa mostly grows on rock shelves near the upper Georges River and on the Central Coast, subspecies glabrescens is only known from near Bankstown Airport and subspecies puberula grows in a range of habitats near Sydney and in Morton National Park.

Conservation status
Hibbertia puberula subsp. glabrescens is only known from about 100 mature plants and is listed as "critically endangered" under the Australian Government Environment Protection and Biodiversity Conservation Act 1999 and the New South Wales Government Biodiversity Conservation Act 2016.

See also
List of Hibbertia species

References

puberula
Flora of New South Wales
Plants described in 2010
Taxa named by Hellmut R. Toelken